Abū al-ʻAtāhiyya (748–828), full name Abu Ishaq Isma'il ibn al-Qasim ibn Suwayd Al-Anzi, was among the principal Arab poets of the early Islamic era, a prolific muwallad poet of ascetics who ranked with Bashār and Abū Nuwās, whom he met. He renounced poetry for a time on religious grounds.

Life
Abū l-ʻAtāhiyya was born in Ayn al-Tamr in the Iraqi desert, near al-Anbar. There are two sayings in his lineage the first is that he is from the Anazzah tribe, and the other is that His family were mawali of the tribe of ʻAnaza. His youth was spent in Kufa, where he was engaged for some time in selling pottery. During the time when he took the occupation of selling pottery, he saw the assembly of poets in a competition and he participated in it. He composed eulogia to the governor of Tabaristan, emir Umar Ibn al-Alā (783-4/ 167AH). and with a growing reputation, he was drawn to Baghdad, the seat of the Abbāsid court where he soon became famous for his verses, especially for those addressed to ‘Utbah, a concubine of the Abbasid Caliph al-Mahdi. His love was unrequited, although al-Mahdi, and after him Caliph ar-Rashīd, interceded for him. Having offended the caliph, he was imprisoned for a short time. He died in 828 in the reign of Caliph al-Ma'mūn, and Al-Nadīm cites the qāḍī of al-Kūfah Ibn Kāmil (d.961) that he died on the same day as the grammarian ‘Amr ibn Abī ‘Amr al-Shaybānī and the court musician Ibrāhīm al-Mawṣilī in 828-9 / 213 AH. His tomb was on the banks of the Īsā canal. opposite the Kantarat al-Zaiyātīn ('Oilmen Bridge')

Legacy

The poetry of Abū l-ʻAtāhiyya is notable for its avoidance of the artificiality almost universal in his days. The older poetry of the desert had been constantly imitated up to this time, although it was not natural to town life. Abū l-ʻAtāhiyya was one of the first to drop the old qasīda (elegy) form. He was very fluent and used many metres. He is also regarded as one of the earliest philosophical poets of the Arabs. Much of his poetry is concerned with the observation of common life and morality, and at times is pessimistic. Thus he was strongly suspected of heresy.
Ibn Abī Ṭāhir Ṭayfūr (819/20 —893/94) published an anthology of Abū al-‘Atāhiyah’s poetry. He was also included in Hārūn ibn ‘Alī al-Munajjim’s unfinished anthology “Traditions of the Poets,” along with contemporary poets Abū Nuwās and Bashshār et al. The vizier Ibn ‘Ammār al-Thaqafī (d. 931/ 319 AH) wrote Traditions about Abū al-‘Atāhiyah.

The Family of Abū al-‘Atāhiyah

Abū al-‘Atāhiyah produced poets among his children and grandchildren who each wrote fifty leaves of poetry:

Muḥammad ibn Abī al-‘Atāhiyah, surnamed Abū ‘Abd Allāh, was a hermit nicknamed al-‘Atāhiyah (the Foolish One).
‘Abd Allāh ibn Muḥammad ibn Abī al-‘Atāhiyah.
Abū Suwayd ‘Abd al-Qāwī ibn Muḥammad ibn Abī al-‘Atāhiyah.
Of the many anecdotes told of al-‘Atāhiyah, al-Nadīm relates one attributed to the Abbāsid court musician, Isḥāq al-Mawṣilī, that whenever he, al-Mawṣilī, saw three men, three others appeared: “Wherever al-Haytham ibn ‘Adī was seen, Hishām al-Kalbī was there; if ‘Allawīyah was there then Mukhāriq turned up; Abū Nuwās was on hand if Abū al-‘Atāhiyah appeared.".

Notes

References

Bibliography
Diwan (1887, Beirut: Jesuit Press; 2nd ed. 1888)
translated and published by Arthur Wormhoudt as Diwan Abu'l Atahiya (1981) 

 

Alfred von Kremer, Culturgeschichte des Orients (1877, Vienna) vol. II, pp 372 ff

Stefan Sperl, Mannerism in Arabic Poetry: A Structural Analysis of Selected Texts (3rd Century AH/9th Century AD–5th Century AH/11th Century AD) (2005, Cambridge University Press) 
Tzvetan Theophanov, "Abu-l-'Atahiya and the Philosophy". In: T. Theophanov. Philosophy and Arts in the Islamic World: Proceedings of the 18th Congress of the Union Europeenne des Arabisants et Islamisants (1998), p. 41-55. 

748 births
828 deaths
Poets from the Abbasid Caliphate
8th-century Arabic poets
9th-century Arabic poets